Miss World Germany is a national Beauty pageant in Germany to select an official candidate for the Miss World pageant.

History
Between 1951 and 1991 the Miss Germany winner went to Miss World. In 1989 German beauty pageant for Miss World has been built but Miss Germany Company select the official representative from Miss World Germany pageant for first time in 1992. Since 2000, the pageant changed name as German's Miss World pageant until 2001. In 2002-2007, Miss World Germany pageant selected the winner as Miss World Germany. In 2008-2009 it changed as Miss World Deutschland to Schönste in 2010-presents, after in 2014 changed to Miss Deutschland Organisation and 2018 to SHOWSTARS.

Titleholders

Color key

2008-2009: Miss World Deutschland

2002-2007: Miss Germany World

2000-2001: German's Miss World - MGC

1992-1999: Miss World Germany - MGC

1952-1991

See also
Miss Germany
Miss Universe Germany
Miss International Germany
Miss Earth Germany

References

External links 
 

Beauty pageants in Germany 
Recurring events established in 1989
1989 establishments in Germany
Germany
German awards